Michael Vincent "Mike" Strange (born August 6, 1970) is a Canadian former amateur boxer. As an amateur, he competed at three consecutive Summer Olympics as a light welterweight (< 64 kg), starting in 1992 in Barcelona, Spain.

Boxing career
Strange started boxing at the age of 10 and started taking the sport seriously when he saw two of his idols in the 1984 Olympics win two silver medals for Canada (Willie deWit and Shawn O'Sullivan). Strange's dream was to compete for Canada at the Olympic Games and his dream came true three times as he competed in three consecutive Summer Olympic Games in 1992, 96, and 2000. Strange had over 350 amateur bouts and won gold medals at the 1994 and 1998 Commonwealth Games in Canada and Malaysia, respectively. Strange was also the first Canadian boxer to be named the Flag Bearer for Team Canada at the closing ceremonies in Malaysia. Mike was named the "Canadian boxer of the year" in 1996 and in 1998.

To raise money for cancer awareness, Strange started the Box Run. He began running from Thunder Bay, Ontario towards Victoria, British Columbia on April 12, 2012. He ran 81 dys of an average of over 40 km per day finishing his run on July 3, 2012 in Victoria at Mile Zero, 3,149 km later. The Box Run raised over $100,000 for Childhood Cancer Canada.

In 2014, the Box Run became an official registered charity. It is a completely volunteer-based organization focused on raising funds through athletic endeavours.

On May 8, 2014, Strange embarked on another run for childhood cancer. Dubbed the "90 in 90", Strange ran 94 Marathons in 94 days from St. John's Newfoundland to his hometown of Niagara Falls. The run was in honor of 12-year old Matteo Mancini, Strange's inspiration from his first Box Run who lost his battle to cancer on May 8, 2013.

In August 2016, Strange and three teammates set out on the "Box Climb". The troop summited the Breithorn, a mountain peak adjacent to the Matterhorn in Switzerland.

In September 2018, to commemorate Childhood Cancer Awareness month, Strange set out on the Camino de Santiago, an 800km spiritual journey through Spain. Each of the 30 days was dedicated to a child who has fought or is fighting cancer.

Amateur results
1992 Olympic Games (as a Featherweight)
Lost to Somluck Kamsing (Thailand) 9-11

1994 Commonwealth Games (as a Lightweight)
Defeated Emmanuel Clottey (Ghana) 29-3
Defeated Irvin Buhlalu (South Africa) 8-7
Defeated Hassan Matumla (Tanzania) 11-6
Defeated Kalolo Fiaui (New Zealand) 12-2
Defeated Martin Renaghan (Ireland) 18-11

1995 Pan American Games (as a Lightweight)
Defeated Benjamin Bucio (Mexico) 4-2
Defeated Franklin Frias (Dominican Republic) 11-6
Lost to Julio González (Cuba) 2-13

1996 Olympic Games (as a Lightweight)
Defeated Francisco Martínez (Mexico) 15-1
Defeated Mekhak Ghazaryan (Armenia) 16-7
Lost to Tontcho Tontchev (Bulgaria) 10-16

1998 Commonwealth Games (as a Light Welterweight)
Defeated Hassan Matumla (Tanzania) 21-7
Defeated Kloba Sehloho (Lesotho) 21-1
Defeated Davis Mwale (Zambia) 19-1
Defeated Gerry Legras (Seychelles) 16-8

2000 Olympic Games (as a Light Welterweight)
Lost to Nurhan Süleymanoğlu (Turkey) 3-9

Politics
In 2014, Strange was elected to Niagara Falls City Council. In July 2017, Strange filed his papers to seek the Progressive Conservative Party of Ontario nomination in the 2018 general election, contesting Niagara Falls. Strange was re-elected to Niagara Falls City Council in 2018, and ran as an independent in the riding of Niagara Falls in the 2019 Canadian federal election.

Personal life
Strange previously owned the "Highland Tap" pub in Niagara Falls, Ontario for 21 years.

References

External links
 Canadian Olympic Committee
 Box Run
 
 
 
 

1970 births
Living people
Canadian male boxers
Light-welterweight boxers
Olympic boxers of Canada
Boxers at the 1992 Summer Olympics
Boxers at the 1996 Summer Olympics
Boxers at the 2000 Summer Olympics
Commonwealth Games gold medallists for Canada
Commonwealth Games medallists in boxing
Boxers at the 1990 Commonwealth Games
Boxers at the 1994 Commonwealth Games
Boxers at the 1998 Commonwealth Games
Pan American Games bronze medalists for Canada
Pan American Games medalists in boxing
Boxers at the 1995 Pan American Games
Sportspeople from Niagara Falls, Ontario
Canadian sportsperson-politicians
Niagara Falls, Ontario city councillors
Independent candidates for the Canadian House of Commons
Medalists at the 1995 Pan American Games
Medallists at the 1994 Commonwealth Games
Medallists at the 1998 Commonwealth Games